Puzgah (also Romanized as Pūzgāh and Poozgah; also known as Pūrgan and Pūzeh Gāh) is a village in Rudhaleh Rural District, Rig District, Ganaveh County, Bushehr Province, Iran. At the 2006 census, its population was 684, in 129 families.

References 

Populated places in Ganaveh County